This is a list of years in Denmark.

Earlier centuries
 10th century in Denmark
 11th century in Denmark
 12th century in Denmark
 13th century in Denmark
 14th century in Denmark

15th century

16th century

17th century

18th century

19th century

20th century

21st century

See also
 Timeline of Copenhagen

Further reading

External links
 

 
Denmark history-related lists
Denmark